Typhlokorynetes plana is a species of small, button-shaped asaphid trilobites of the family Raphiophoridae that lived during the Early Tremadocian of Vermont, United States.

Etymology 
The generic epithet is a compound word of the Greek words "Typhlos," meaning "blind," and "Korynetes," which means "club-bearer," in reference to the animal's eyeless state, and the glabellum that is shaped in the outline of a club or bowling pin.  The specific name "plana" refers to the flattened nature of the body.

History of taxonomy
The first fossils of this trilobite were described by P. E. Raymond in 1937 as a blind proetid that he named "Warburgella" plana.  In 1959, "W." plana would be redescribed by H. B. Whittington as a species of Raymondaspis in the family Styginidae.  Alan Shaw voiced a similar opinion when he moved it into its own genus and family, Typhlokorynetes in Typhlokorynetidae, in that it maybe a specialized styginid with unusual or aberrant sutures and hypostome anatomy.  During the 1970s, it was then reappraised as a relative of Endymion in Raphiophoridae.

Occurrence 
Specimens are known from the Highgate Formation in northwestern Vermont.

References 

Asaphida
Ordovician trilobites of North America
Geology of Vermont